Vardi   (trans: Police Uniform) is a 1989 Bollywood action crime film directed by Umesh Mehra. It stars Sunny Deol, Jackie Shroff, Kimi Katkar, Madhuri Dixit in pivotal roles.

Plot
When Inspector Verma arrests the criminal Lalchand, the latter exacts his revenge by kidnapping Verma's only son, Anil. He later informs Verma that he has killed the boy. While trying to apprehend Lalchand, Verma's loyal accomplice and friend, Havaldar Bhagwan Singh is killed by the criminal. Verma and his wife Shanti then decide to raise Bhagwan Singh's son Ajay as their own. Many years pass and Ajay grows up to be an honest and brave police inspector while Verma has become the Commissioner of Police. Their main goal is to arrest Lalchand, who by now has become the kingpin of the underworld. In the process, Ajay learns that Verma's son is actually alive but has turned to a life of crime. Now it is up to Ajay to not only capture the crime lord Lalchand but also to reunite Commissioner Verma with his long lost son.

Cast

 Sunny Deol as Inspector Ajay Singh 
 Jackie Shroff as Anil Verma / Jai
 Kimi Katkar as Dr. Sonu Kaul
 Madhuri Dixit as Jaya (Guest Appearance)
 Vinod Mehra as Police Commissioner Verma
 Kader Khan as Lalchand / Balkishan (Double Role) 
 Paresh Rawal as Rudra
 Raza Murad as Kalan Khan
 Shafi Inamdar as Shambhu
 Anjana Mumtaz as Shanti Verma
 Satish Kaushik
 Tom Alter as Tom
 Bob Christo as Bob
 Sudhir Dalvi as Inspector General of Police
 Leena Das as Dancer
 Sameer Khakhar as Havaldar
 Shammi as Customer
 Viju Khote as Kasturi
 Shubha Khote as Mrs. Kaul
 Roopesh Kumar as Kasturi
 Deep Dhillon as Rudra's Brother
 Dharmendra as Constable Bhagwan Singh (Special Appearance)

Soundtrack
This film music by Anu Malik and featured the first major Bollywood song of the singer Kumar Sanu, while the songs are written by Anand Bakshi.

References

External links

1990 films
Films scored by Anu Malik
1990s Hindi-language films
1980s Hindi-language films
Films directed by Umesh Mehra